Christina Goh is a French singer, songwriter and poet.

Biography

The daughter of an Ivorian father and a mother from Martinique, Christina Goh was born in 1977 in
Paris, France. She spent her life in Côte d'Ivoire and went to university in France but finally chose a musical career at the age of 23.
Her first album was recorded in 2003, however, it is only in 2009, that the single "Réputation de peine" (Reputation of sorrow), released and sold in Martinique, was played on French-speaking radios of Japan, Greece, Andorra, Brazil and Quebec.

Christina Goh, named "La perle noire de l'afro-blues" (Afro-blues black pearl), puts together African, Caribbean and blues styles, but she remains at the same time faithful to French song texts.

In 2008, she created the Christina Goh Concept, which is an atypical trio: djembe, guitar, voice or piano, guitar, voice.
The djembe is always the rhythmic point of the presentation.
Its fusion with the electric guitar, whose blues accents translate the poetic characteristic of the concept, is atypical. In 2010, the musical album Christina Goh Concept was recorded in French West Indies and sold by the label ICE Consulting in Martinique. The ten-titled album on Plaza Mayor Company Ltd label made the world discover the concept on the web.

Christina Goh wrote two collections of poems. Le concept en poèmes (The concept in poems), her second collection, is what she named "a new experiment", where she explains in poems, the ten universes of the ten songs of the album Christina Goh Concept.

In 2010, she was in concert in Avignon Festival Off, named "the greatest theater of the world" in France, invited by the Laurette Theater.

Awards 
 2015 : 14th Independent Music Awards Nominee - Eclectic EP category

Discography
 Tranquille (album) 2003
 Métissée chocolat (single) 2007
 Eveil (EP) 2008
 3 Emotions (EP) 2009
 Christina Goh Concept (album) 2010
 N'oublie pas (single) 2012
 Fusion (album) 2012
 Invisible EP (EP) 2014
 14 Melodies (Live at Le Petit Faucheux France) (album CD/DVD) 2015

Bibliography
 Le chant des coeurs 2009
 Le concept en poèmes 2010
 Fort, utile et beau 2011
 Du noir et blanc à la couleur 2013
 14 Mélodies en confidences poétiques 2015

See also

 Music of France

References

External links
Christina Goh official website
Christina Goh official Myspace

1977 births
Living people
Writers from Paris
French women poets
Torch singers
French people of Ivorian descent
Ballad musicians
French people of Martiniquais descent
French women pop singers
21st-century French singers
21st-century French women singers